Adtranz was a multi-national rail transportation equipment manufacturer with facilities concentrated in Europe and the US. The company, legally known as ABB Daimler-Benz Transportation was created in 1996 as a joint venture between ABB Group and Daimler-Benz to combine their rail equipment manufacturing operations. In 1999, DaimlerChrysler (successor to Daimler-Benz) bought ABB's shares and changed the company's official name to DaimlerChrysler Rail Systems. The company was acquired by Bombardier Inc. in 2001, which merged it into its Bombardier Transportation division, which became the largest rail equipment manufacturer in the world at the time.

Adtranz manufactured locomotives, high-speed, regional, metro and underground passenger trains, trams and people movers as well as freight wagons. Non rolling stock businesses included railway electrification and signalling infrastructure.

History 
On 8 May 1995 ABB and Daimler-Benz proposed a merger of their rail industry related activities into a single autonomous 50:50 joint venture; the combined group would be the largest rail-technology company in the world.  In Germany the combined company, along with Siemens would have a duopoly or near-duopoly in the market areas of electric locomotives, mainline and regional electric and diesel multiple units, trams and metros, and catenary systems. In the EU, outside Germany, the merger would have meant no significant market share increase, including Scandinavia, where ABB had a dominant market share. The proposed merger was approved by government regulators on 18 October 1995, on the condition that both companies divest themselves of any shares in Kiepe, a traction components company. The merger came into force on 1 January 1996.

The company's manufacturing facilities and product lines were rationalised, including a standard form of car body; after 18 months manufacturing costs had been reduced by 30%, revenues and orders also rose from 1996 to 1997. However the company continued to lose money, $111 million in 1997. Polish manufacturer Pafawag was acquired in 1997 and the facility modernised, controlling interests in  MÁV Dunakeszi, Hungary and Schindler Waggon Switzerland were also acquired by the end of 1997.In March 1998 Adtranz presented a set of new product brands for modular product platforms, with designs that can be adapted for the specific requirements of different customers: the Innovia guided transport vehicle, the Incentro low floor tram, the Itino diesel multiple unit, the Crusaris medium-high speed train (based on the GMB Class 71 flytoget trains), and the Octeon electric locomotive. A new diesel locomotive design with engine and electrical traction system provided by General Electric was introduced, named "Blue Tiger". Adtranz intended to consolidate its product range around these families once on-going deliveries are finished.

Adtranz continued to make an operating loss in 1998, attributed to earlier contracts with underestimated costs, as well as technical problems with products. The same year brought an order for 400 locomotives for Deutsche Bahn, as well as the acquisition of Swiss Locomotive and Machine Works.

ABB sold its 50% stake in Adtranz to DaimlerChrysler in January 1999 for $472 million, taking up a previous agreement made on the formation of the joint venture whereby DaimlerChrysler was required to purchase ABB's stake.

Adtranz finally achieved profitability in 2000, as DaimlerChrysler prepared to sell off Adtranz. The Greenbrier Companies acquired the freight wagon manufacturing business in January 2000. The overhead electrification systems installations business was sold to Balfour Beatty in late 2000 for €153 million. No buyer was found for the railway signalling division.

The remaining assets of Adtranz were sold to Bombardier, in a $711 million deal announced in August 2000, a price considered to be low by industry analysts. The sale was cleared by the European Union in April 2001 on the condition that Bombardier would license or sell the Adtranz regional train and tram products to Stadler Rail in the German market, due to the large market share of Bombardier and Adtranz in the country. The deal would make Stadler a viable independent company providing competition to Bombardier. The takeover came into legal effect on 1 May 2001 with a final price of $725 million and ADtranz was folded into the Bombardier Transportation division. 

Within months of the sale, Bombardier said that it was misled about the financial situation of Adtranz. Bombardier sued DaimlerChrysler for providing misleading financial information. The companies settled in September 2004 with DaimlerChrysler agreeing to refund $209 million, making the final sale price for Adtranz just $516 million.

Brand 

The brand Adtranz was created by Landor Associates as part of the corporate identity of ABB Daimler Benz Transportation. It is an acronym derived from selected letters of the complete name of the first company using it: ABB Daimler-Benz Transportation, with a z in place of an s at the end for the name to imply a complete product platform from A to Z. It was capitalised by the companies with a capital D as ADtranz, following the standard English text formatting and capitalisation rules it is spelled with a small d as Adtranz. Above the text ADtranz, the company logo included a green dot, symbolising a signal set on green, as well as the environmental friendliness of railways.  In addition to the company also registered the slogan ADtranz – we speak railways. Rights on the brand and slogan were deleted in 2008 and 2007 respectively.

Products 

Locomotives
E464 electric locomotive
 Norges Statsbaner El 18 locomotive
 Wide gauge 3-phase AC-traction passenger locomotive WAP-5 for Indian Railways
 DE2000 locomotive for the Hellenic Railways Organization, designated as OSE Class 220 (formerly designated as OSE A 471-496)

Subway rail vehicles
 M4 subway/elevated cars for SEPTA Market–Frankford Line, in Philadelphia
 New York City Subway R142A IRT Subway cars
 Washington Metro 5000-series cars (with CAF)
 Hong Kong MTR Lantau Airport Railway Train (with CAF)
 Class 481 of Berlin S-Bahn
 Metro Bilbao 550 series EMUs (with CAF)
 Metro Madrid 2000B units (With CAF)
Metro Madrid 6000 units (With CAF, Alstom and Siemens)
Athens Metro Line 1 11th Generation Units (With Siemens and Hellinic Shipyards S.A.)
High speed trains
 German ICE 2 high speed train
 Swedish X 2000 high-speed train
 Norges Statsbaner BM73 and Flytoget BM71 high-speed EMUs
Passenger trains
 Swedish Regina intercity electric multiple units
 Adtranz-CAF Series 6000 trains (include MTR Adtranz-CAF EMU)
 IC3 Flexliner
 RegioSwinger tilting train
 CityRail Endeavour and CountryLink Xplorer railcars in Australia
 Electrostar and Turbostars in the United Kingdom
 Queensland Rail Suburban Multiple Units and Interurban Multiple Units, Australia.
 C20 metro stock, used in Stockholm, Sweden
 CAF/Alstom/ADtranz Series 2000 commuter train, São Paulo, Brazil
CAF/Alstom/Siemens 447 commuter units of Renfe
Trams
 Eurotram
 Flexity Outlook tram
 Variotram
 Incentro tram
 ADtranz low floor trams; GT6N for Berlin, Augsburg, Frankfurt (Oder), Bremen, Nurnberg, Munich, Braunschweig, Takaoka, Okayama and Toyama
Light rail passenger vehicles

 Manila Light Rail Transit System Line 1 2nd Generation Light Rail Vehicles (with Hyundai Precision)
 Ankara Metro Ankaray Light Metro Line A1 (with Siemens and AnsaldoBreda)
 İzmir Metro Line 1
 Kuala Lumpur Metro Line 3 first generation 6-car trains (1996–2016)
Automated people movers
 Innovia APM 100

Facilities inherited on foundation 
Kalmar Verkstad (Sweden)
Strømmens Værksted (Norway)
ABB Tecnomasio
 Vado Ligure (Italy)
Henschel-Werke
Commonwealth Engineering (Dandenong, Australia)
AEG Schienenfahrzeuge in Hennigsdorf (Germany)
Derby Litchurch Lane Works, British Rail Engineering Limited (UK)
Sorefame (Portugal).
Westinghouse Transportation (Pittsburgh, PA, USA) – via AEG acquisition 1988

Notes

References

Sources 

Note: only German text is considered legally authentic, see:

External links 

Archive of Adranz homepage

 
ABB
Mercedes-Benz Group
Railway signalling manufacturers
2001 mergers and acquisitions